Pingtung County Council is the county council of Pingtung County, Republic of China. It is currently composed of 55 councillors, all recently elected in the 2018 Taiwanese local elections. Being the largest county council in terms of seats, it succeeded the former Pingtung City Senate on 1 October 1950 after reorganization of the local governments.

Organization 
 Procedural Office
 General Affairs Office
 Administration Office
 Legal Department
 Accounting Office
 Personnel Office

Transportation 
The council building is accessible within walking distance of the Pingtung railway station.

See also 
 List of county magistrates of Pingtung
 Pingtung County Government

References

External links

  

County councils of Taiwan
Pingtung County